Guards, also referred to as Guardsmen, is a rapid deployment elite infantry formation of the Singapore Army responsible for conducting air assault, expeditionary, and amphibious operations.

Like their counterpart in the United States—the Marines, the Guards formation will be the first on the ground in combat situations, leading the charge when conflict arises.

History
The Guards formation was created on 1 January 1975 as the 7th Singapore Infantry Brigade (7 SIB) with four officers, five specialists and a few clerks. 7 SIB subsequently took command of the Infantry Training Depot (ITD) on 1 January 1976 and the 7th Battalion, Singapore Infantry Regiment (7 SIR) and 8th Battalion, Singapore Infantry Regiment (8 SIR) on 9 February 1976. On 1 July 1976, 7 SIB was declared operational. In view of its operational role, the ITD was removed from 7 SIB, and the SAF Guards Unit (SAFGU), formed in the 1960s for guard mounting at the Istana and other public duties activities, came under the command of 7 SIB.

SAFGU was renamed 1st Battalion, Singapore Guards (1 Guards) on 1 July 1977. On 1 April 1978, 8 SIR became the 2nd Battalion, Singapore Guards (2 Guards). 7 SIB was designated as an elite brigade on 1 April 1978. On 6 April 1979, 1 Guards held a parade during which Major-General Winston Choo, Chief of General Staff, presented the soldiers with berets with new cap badge backings to denote their elite status.

On 31 July 1980, the soldiers of 7 SIB received stable belts as another symbol of their elite status. In that same year, 7 SIB was reorganised into a brigade consisting of only Guardsmen. 7 SIR was renamed 3rd Battalion, Singapore Guards (3 Guards). The three Guards battalions received their colours on 11 June 1983. On 23 June 1989, the Guardsmen received the Guards tab, which they wear on the left sleeves of their uniforms.

On 9 June 1994, the Guards adopted the khaki beret to replace the olive green beret, which is still used by the Infantry formation. On 11 October 1994, the Guards formally became a formation of the Singapore Army. All Guards units, including 7 SIB, are now under the administration and command of HQ Guards.

Operations

Guards has been deployed to provide support in disaster relief and humanitarian aid operations, such as during the 1986 Hotel New World collapse in Singapore, the 2004 Indian Ocean earthquake and tsunami, the 2011 Christchurch earthquake, the Aceh Monitoring Mission in Timor Leste and the humanitarian aid mission in Afghanistan from 2007 to 2013.

Training
To qualify as Guardsmen, enlistees need to complete the Guards Vocational Training, while officers and specialists will need to complete the Guards Conversion Course (GCC).

Guardsmen are trained for heliborne insertions into combat zones. They can do this either by rapid disembarkation while the helicopter is landing, or by rappelling from a hovering helicopter, or fast-roping straight onto rooftops. As landing zones may be hostile, Guardsmen train in various forms of combat rappelling. This may involve rappelling head-first. 

They also train for exigencies. If, due to an injury they are unable to brace themselves against a cliff face, they may be required to rappel unconventionally, with their backs facing the cliff, or with a stretcher. Other methods include Australian rappelling.

Equipment

See also
 Army Deployment Force
 Commandos
 Infantry
 United States Marine Corps

References 

1975 establishments in Singapore
Formations of the Singapore Army
Guards regiments
Military units and formations established in 1975